Million Dollar Legs is a 1939 American comedy film starring Betty Grable, Jackie Coogan, John Hartley and Donald O'Connor.

The film has no relation to the W. C. Fields movie from seven years earlier also entitled Million Dollar Legs.

Plot

Cast
 Betty Grable as Carol Parker
 John Hartley as Greg Melton Jr.
 Buster Crabbe as Coach Jordan (as Larry Crabbe)
 Donald O'Connor as Sticky Boone
 Jackie Coogan as Russ Simpson
 Dorothea Kent as Susie Quinn
 Joyce Mathews as Bunny Maxwell
 Peter Lind Hayes as Freddie 'Ten-Percent' Fry (as Peter Hayes)
 Richard Denning as Hunk Jordan
 Phil Warren as Buck Hogan
 Edward Arnold Jr. as Blimp Garrett
 Thurston Hall as Gregory Melton Sr.
 Roy Gordon as Dean Wixby
 Matty Kemp as Ed Riggs
 William Tracy as Egghead Jackson
 William Holden as Graduate Who Says 'Thank You' (uncredited)

Production
Betty Grable and Jackie Coogan were married at the time and had appeared together the previous year playing supporting roles in the musical comedy College Swing starring George Burns, Gracie Allen, Martha Raye and Bob Hope. Not long after this film, Twentieth Century-Fox insured Grable's legs for $1 million.

References

External links
 
 
 
 

1939 films
1930s English-language films
1939 comedy films
American black-and-white films
Films directed by Edward Dmytryk
Films directed by Nick Grinde
American comedy films
Paramount Pictures films
1930s American films